Conus glaucus, common name the glaucous cone, is a species of sea snail, a marine gastropod mollusk in the family Conidae, the cone snails and their allies.

Like all species within the genus Conus, these snails are predatory and venomous. They are capable of "stinging" humans, therefore live ones should be handled carefully or not at all.

Description
The size of the shell varies between 30 mm and 65 mm. The color of the shell is bluish ash or very light chocolate, with usually a lighter narrow central band, and numerous short chocolate lines in revolving series. The spire is broadly radiated with chocolate.

Distribution
This marine species occurs off the Philippines, Indonesia and Vanuatu.

References

 Linnaeus, C. (1758). Systema Naturae per regna tria naturae, secundum classes, ordines, genera, species, cum characteribus, differentiis, synonymis, locis. Editio decima, reformata. Laurentius Salvius: Holmiae. ii, 824 pp. 
 Puillandre N., Duda T.F., Meyer C., Olivera B.M. & Bouchet P. (2015). One, four or 100 genera? A new classification of the cone snails. Journal of Molluscan Studies. 81: 1–23

External links
 The Conus Biodiversity website
 Cone Shells - Knights of the Sea
 

glaucus
Gastropods described in 1758
Taxa named by Carl Linnaeus